Alfred John Cleverley (18 September 1907 – 2 August 1992) was a New Zealand boxer from Petone.

He competed in the 1928 Olympics in the men's light-heavyweight section, but lost on points in the first round to Alf Jackson of Great Britain. After the Olympics he competed in the Tailtean Games in Dublin then fought professionally in Long Beach, California. He returned to New Zealand in 1930, married, and resumed work at the Railways Workshops at Petone then at the Hutt as a fitter.

He died in Rotorua on 25 July 1992.

1928 Olympic results
Below is the record of Alf Cleverley, a New Zealand light heavyweight boxer who competed at the 1928 Amsterdam Olympics:

 Round of 16: lost to Alf Jackson (Great Britain) by decision

References

Interview in Petone News of 16 November 1983.
Page at BoxRec website, No 124197 (?) 
Page at BoxRec website, No 129967

External links
 
 
 Photo of Alf Cleverley

1907 births
1992 deaths
Olympic boxers of New Zealand
Boxers at the 1928 Summer Olympics
People from Petone
Light-heavyweight boxers
New Zealand male boxers
20th-century New Zealand people